Kindu Airport  is an airport serving the Lualaba River port of Kindu, Democratic Republic of the Congo.

Airlines and destinations

See also

Transport in the Democratic Republic of the Congo
List of airports in the Democratic Republic of the Congo
Kindu atrocity

References

External links
Kindu Airport at OpenStreetMap
Kindu Airport at OurAirports

Kindu Airport at FallingRain

Kindu
Airports in Maniema